Fenno may refer to:
Various concepts related to Finland

People
John Fenno, U.S. Federalist Party editor 
Richard Fenno, American political scientist
Charles Fenno Hoffman, American author, poet and editor 
Charles Fenno Jacobs, American photographer